Andrew Wylie (born 31 December 1971) is a South African cricketer. He played in 23 first-class and 28 List A matches for Boland from 1992/93 to 1997/98.

See also
 List of Boland representative cricketers

References

External links
 

1971 births
Living people
South African cricketers
Boland cricketers
Cricketers from Pietermaritzburg